Stanley is an unincorporated community in Daviess County, Kentucky, United States. Its zip code was 42375, but its post office closed in 1997.

Demographics

Climate
The climate in this area is characterized by hot, humid summers and generally mild to cool winters.  According to the Köppen Climate Classification system, Stanley has a humid subtropical climate, abbreviated "Cfa" on climate maps.

References

Unincorporated communities in Daviess County, Kentucky
Unincorporated communities in Kentucky